National Highway 334D, commonly referred to as NH 334D is a national highway in India. It is a secondary route of National Highway 34.  NH-334D runs in the states of Uttar Pradesh and Haryana in India.

Route 
NH334D connects Aligarh, Khair, Jewar and Palwal in the states of Uttar Pradesh and Haryana.

Junctions  
 
  Terminal near Aligarh.
 Junction with Yamuna Expressway near Tappal
  Terminal near Palwal.

See also 
 List of National Highways in India
 List of National Highways in India by state

References

External links 

 NH 334D on OpenStreetMap

National highways in India
National Highways in Uttar Pradesh
National Highways in Haryana